Racine station could refer to:

 Racine station (CTA Blue Line)
 Racine station (CTA Green Line)
 Racine station (CTA Metropolitan Main Line)
 Racine station, a Lake Street Elevated station